Dixon Elementary School may refer to:

 United States
 Arthur Dixon Elementary School in Chicago, a part of Chicago Public Schools
 Dixon Elementary School in Irvington, Alabama, a part of the Mobile County Public School System
 Dixon Elementary School in Dixon, Kentucky, a part of Webster County School District
 Dixon Elementary School in Holly Ridge, North Carolina, a part of Onslow County Schools
 Dixon Elementary School in Brookfield, Wisconsin, a part of Elmbrook Schools
 Canada
 Alfred B. Dixon Elementary School, in Richmond, British Columbia, a part of the Richmond School District